Reaching for the Best is a 1975 song by The Exciters, written and produced by Herb Rooney and a new young producer, Ian Levine. The song was aimed at the British Northern Soul scene, but crossed over to the UK Singles Chart where it peaked at No. 31.

References

The Exciters songs
1975 songs
20th Century Fox Records singles
1975 singles